Real Pilar Fútbol Club is a football club located in Pilar, a city of Buenos Aires Province. The squad currently plays in Primera D, the fifth division of the Argentine football league system, having debuted in the 2017–18 season.

The team plays its home venues at Municipal Stadium Carlos Barraza of Pilar.

History
The club was established by entrepreneur César Mansilla, that had previously worked for Mauricio Macri, Chief of Government of Buenos Aires by those times. Mansilla was also a personal friend of Boca Juniors (and then Argentine Football Association –AFA vice-president) Daniel Angelici.

Despite not having football players and manager, Real Pilar affiliated to the AFA to play in Primera D, through an Association's rules exemption that allowed the club to be registered as provisional member. The decision was heavily criticized by some journalists that stated the club had been favoured because of Mansilla's ties with the political power represented by Macri and Angelici. Nevertheless, Mansilla denied that his relation with Macri had favoured Real Pilar to get a place in AFA domestic league. Real Pilar was also the first club which request was accepted by the Association within 40 years (the last clubs to be registered to AFA had been Defensa y Justicia, Argentino de Merlo, Laferrere, San Miguel and Claypole, all in 1977).

Real Pilar's official debut was on September 3, 2017, against Victoriano Arenas. Managed by Roberto Romano, the line-up was: Juan Pablo Ghiglione; Axel Bordón, Diego Carabajal, Gonzalo Pulido, Damián Achucarro; Miguel Almada, Rodrigo Díaz, Rodrigo Santillán, Alejandro Acuña; Carlos Perrone, Alejo Binaghi. The squad lost to Victoriano Arenas 3–1. In October 2017, the Association Assembly ratified Real Pilar's affiliation to the body.

Players

Current squad

Female football
Real Pilar FC has also a women's football team that played its first official match in the Second Division. Therefore, Real Pilar became the first club in Argentine football history to debut with men's and women's team in the same season.

References

External links

 

R
R